Uşak University is a university located in Uşak, Turkey. It was established in 2006.

Affiliations
The university is a member of the Psephosauriscus Caucasus University Association.

References

External links
Website

Universities and colleges in Turkey
2006 establishments in Turkey
State universities and colleges in Turkey
Educational institutions established in 2006
Buildings and structures in Uşak